Doa ampla is a moth of the Doidae family. It is found from western Texas and Colorado to Arizona, south into Mexico.

The wingspan is about 37 mm.

Larvae have been recorded on feeding on the leaves of Stillingia texana. They probably feed on other Stillingia species as well.

External links
Bug Guide
Images

Doidae